Calcutta Stone or known in Indonesia as Pucangan Inscription is an ancient Javanese inscription written in Sanskrit and Old Javanese, dated from 1041 CE during the reign of king Airlangga of the Kahuripan kingdom, that explains some events and the royal genealogy of the king. The inscription more or less narrates the life story of King Airlangga, one of the greatest king in Javanese history, also explaining his lineage as the rightful ruler of Java, the successor of King Dharmawangsa of Isyana dynasty. This inscription was known as "Calcutta Stone", because it is stored in Indian Museum, Kolkata (Calcutta), India from 19th century until today.

The Pucangan inscription is a bilingual inscription, it consists of two different sides inscribed on a single monolith. The front side is written in Old Javanese while the other side is written in Sanskrit. Both inscriptions are written in Kawi script (Ancient Javanese script). The inscription scape is a block with pointy top, on the base of the inscription is adorned with padma (lotus) pedestal. The name Pucangan derived from a word in this inscription. It was the name of a place on the slopes of Mount Penanggungan, today located in Mojokerto Regency, East Java.

Content 
The inscription describes a terrible pralaya (calamity) which befell the East Javanese Mataram Kingdom of Isyana Dynasty in the early years of the 11th century. In 1016, a rebellion incited by a vassal king Wurawari from Lwaram resulted in the destruction of the capital of Watugaluh. The reigning king, Dharmawangsa, successor to Sri Makutawangsawardhana, was murdered along with his entire family and many of his subjects. Only the young Airlangga, who was aged about 16 at the time, managed to escape unharmed.

Discovery 
The Pucangan inscription was discovered on the slope of Mount Penanggungan in East Java and sent to Sir Thomas Stamford Raffles, the British Governor General of Java 1813–1816 in Batavia. In 1812 Raffles sent it together with Sangguran inscription to Lord Minto, Governor-General of India in Calcutta, as a token of appreciation. This inscription was stored in Calcutta Museum while the Sangguran inscription was taken by Lord Minto back to his estate in Hawick, Roxburghshire, Scotland.

Inscription 
Quotation of some verses in the inscription.

Transcription

Translation 
 Congratulation and well-being! respect and great honor for him, always blessed with three guna when the destiny of human (mortals) are already predestinated, so when the destruction (strike or happen) it is meant to be, so be it for the Creator had not the guna. 
 Honor for him, that is (performing) triwikrama, known in the world as (three) great steps without any predisposition, also always honoring the mind (decision) of the King of Gods

Notes

References 
 Kern, H., (1913), Een Oud-Javaansche steeninscriptie van Koning Er-Langga, Gravenhage: Martinus Nijhoff, 13 h.
 Stutterheim, W.E., (1937), Oudheidkundige aantekeningen:XLVIII. Waar lag Erlangga's kluizenarij van den Pucangan?, BKI, 95.
 Poerbatjaraka, R. N., (1941), Strophe 14 van de-Sanskrit-zijde der Calcutta-steen, TBG, LXXXI, 425–437.

Inscriptions in Indonesia
10th-century inscriptions
History of East Java